Hamilton Round Barn is a historic round barn located near Mannington, Marion County, West Virginia.  It was built in 1911, and is circular in shape, measuring 66 feet in diameter and 75 feet high at the center. It features a gambrel roof topped by a six-sided cupola. The barn has horizontal clapboard siding of poplar, painted white, and a slate roof. In 1985, it was one of only five round and polygonal barns standing in West Virginia. The barn was purchased by the West Augusta Historical Society in 1983, and is operated as a museum.

It was listed on the National Register of Historic Places in 1985.

References

External links
Mannington Main Street website

Round barns in the United States
History museums in West Virginia
Barns on the National Register of Historic Places in West Virginia
Infrastructure completed in 1911
Buildings and structures in Marion County, West Virginia
National Register of Historic Places in Marion County, West Virginia
Museums in Marion County, West Virginia
Barns in West Virginia